Archibald Henderson (August 7, 1768 – October 21, 1822) was a legislator, lawyer, and Congressional Representative from North Carolina.

Biography

Henderson was born on August 7, 1768, near Williamsboro, Granville County, North Carolina. He was the son of jurist Richard Henderson, the brother of Chief Justice Leonard Henderson, and father-in-law of U.S. Congressman Nathaniel Boyden.

Henderson attended the Granville common schools, and graduated from Springer College. In ca. 1790, he moved to Salisbury, North Carolina, where he studied law, and was admitted to the bar and commenced practice in Salisbury. The Archibald Henderson Law Office at Salisbury was listed on the National Register of Historic Places in 1972.

He was clerk and master in equity from 1795–1798. Henderson was elected as a Federalist to the Sixth and Seventh United States Congress (March 4, 1799 – March 3, 1803).

He was a member of the North Carolina General Assembly 1807–1809, 1814, 1819, and 1820. He then resumed the practice of law in Salisbury.

Death

Henderson died on October 21, 1822 in Salisbury, North Carolina. Interment was in the City Cemetery.

See also 
 Sixth United States Congress
 Seventh United States Congress

References

External links 

 U.S. Congress Biographical Directory entry
 North Carolina booklet: Great Events in North Carolina History

Members of the North Carolina House of Representatives
1768 births
1822 deaths
Federalist Party members of the United States House of Representatives from North Carolina
People from Granville County, North Carolina